Infinite Mass is a Swedish hip hop group formed in 1991.
In 1992 the group won the talent show Swedish Championship of Rap. The same year, they achieved fame by participating in the movie Sökarna, and released the single "Shoot the Racist", which was later renamed "Area Turns Red". There was some controversy in the Swedish mass media at the time regarding the song's lyrics.

They ended up on the top charts for the first time in 1995 with the songs "Mah boys", "Area Turns Red" and "Ride". They won a Grammis Award for best club/dance song in 1995. In 1997 they released the album Alwayz Somethang and the single "Caught up in da Game". With the album The Face (2001) and songs "She’s A Freak", "Bullet", "Blazin" and "Enter The Dragon", they established their characteristic sound: a G-funk base with a blend of heavy guitars, rapping, singing and unusual samplings. In 2004, their song "No. 1 Swartskalle" became a hit (svartskalle, "black-head", is traditionally a derogatory Swedish slang for immigrants that are non-blonde and non-Nordic looking).

Infinite Mass were, alongside The Latin Kings, one of key groups that emerged from the Swedish hip hop scene in the late 90's.

Group members
Throughout the years, band members have come and gone, but Amir Chamdin, Rodrigo "Rigo" Pencheff and Bechir Eklund are regarded as the core members and have been a part of Infinite Mass since the conception.
Amir Chamdin (Rapping)
Rodrigo "Rigo" Pencheff (Rapping)
Bechir Eklund (Rapping)
Joen Carlstedt (Guitar)
Jejo Perkovic (Drums)
Tito Pencheff (Synthesizer)
Cribbe Pencheff (DJ)
Polarbear  (Rapping & Producer)

Discography

Studio albums
The Infinite Patio (1995)
Alwayz Somethang (1997)
The Face (2002)
1991 (2004)

Live albums
Live In Sweden (1999)

Compilation albums
Masters of the Universe: The Best of Infinite Mass (2007)

Singles
 "Mah Boys" (1995)
 "Area Turns Red" (1995)
 "Ride" (1996)
 "Enter the Dragon" (2000)
 "Bullet" (2001)
 "The Thief" (2004)
 "No 1 Svartskalle" (2004)
 "Take it Back" (2020)

See also
Swedish hip hop

External links
Infinite Mass' official website

Swedish hip hop groups
Musical groups established in 1991
Musical groups disestablished in 2014